An Mám (anglicized as Maum, or sometimes Maam) is a small Gaeltacht village and its surrounding lands in Connemara, County Galway, Ireland.

Name
An Mám is Irish for "the pass" and as this is a Gaeltacht (principally Irish-speaking) area, the area's name formally exists only in Irish - the anglicised form has no official standing, although it has been in use for centuries, too.

Location and access

The village is located at the southern end of the Maam Valley, where it comes to Lough Corrib; the other end lies at Leenaun on Killary Harbour.  The settlement lies at an altitude of around 20 metres, between where the main river of the southern two thirds of the valley, Joyce's River, is captured by the larger Abhainn Beal Atha na mBreac (Bealnabrack River) and where the Failmore River joins that river's mouth at the northern end of the lake. It sits at the edge of a mountainous area, the principal part of which forms the Maumturk or Maamturk Mountains.

An Mám lies north of Maam Cross, an important crossroads from which the main road serving the settlement, and providing a secondary route through the Maam Valley to Leenaun, the R336, comes, splitting off from the R59 Galway to Clifden road.  Maam Bridge, built in 1823, takes the R336 across the Bealnabrack River.

History
This area formed part of the wider Joyce Country, named for a key family grouping, the Joy family, originally from Wales, which dominated the region for centuries.

Features
Historically there was a castle in the area, and from the 19th century, a small courthouse (closed in 2004) and a post office.  Alexander Nimmo built an inn in 1820 at the eastern end of Maam Bridge, and this later became the Maum Hotel, owned by the family of Lord Leitrim for many years; it now operates as Keane's Pub.

The area has several B&B establishments, and there is a hotel complex and service station at Maam Cross.  Many community facilities are provided from Leenaun.  There is free fishing in the river and the nearer parts of the lake, and a jetty was built by Maam Bridge to facilitate angling access.

See also
 List of towns and villages in Ireland

Towns and villages in County Galway
Gaeltacht places in County Galway
Gaeltacht towns and villages